N. a pris les dés... (French for "N. has taken the dice...") is a 1971 French experimental independent underground drama art film directed by Alain Robbe-Grillet.

Production
Alain Robbe-Grillet had signed for a production of two separate films from the same shot, with different editings of the same scenes, so to create two totally different plots: the first was Eden and After, the second N. a pris les dés..., whose title is indeed an anagram of the other movie's original one (L'Éden et après). It tells the same story, but from the point of view of the male protagonist, who becomes the narrative voice, instead of the female protagonist, Violette (Catherine Jourdan).

References

External links

N. a pris les dés... at the TCM Movie Database

1970s avant-garde and experimental films
1971 drama films
1971 independent films
1971 films
Films directed by Alain Robbe-Grillet
French avant-garde and experimental films
French drama films
French independent films
1970s French-language films
1970s French films